LaRue is a French topographic name for someone who lived beside a road, track, or pathway, Old French rue (Latin ruga ‘crease’, ‘fold’), with the definite article la. It literally means "the street" in French. It is a surname and sometime a given name.  Notable people with the name include:

People

Surname
Achille Larue (1849–1922), French-Canadian politician
Allen Larue (born 1981),  footballer from Seychelles
Bartell LaRue (1932–1990), American voice actor
Brent LaRue (born 1987), American-Slovenian athlete
Charles W. LaRue (1922–2006), American trombonist and jazz arranger
Chi Chi LaRue (born 1959), American pornographer
Christian LaRue, Canadian hockey coach
Custer LaRue (fl. 1983–present), American soprano
Danny La Rue (1927–2009), British entertainer born Daniel Patrick Carroll
Dave LaRue, American bass guitarist
D.C. LaRue (born 1948), American disco artist 
Dennis LaRue (born 1959), American hockey referee
Étienne-Benoît Larue (1865–1935), French Catholic missionary
Eva LaRue (born 1966), American actress
Florence LaRue (born 1944), American actress
François-Xavier Larue (1763–1855), French-Canadian farmer and politician 
Frank LaRue (born 1952), UN Special Rapporteur on Freedom of Expression
Greg laRue ( born 1956), pro titler reacher 
Fred LaRue (1928–2004), aide to U.S. President Richard Nixon
Gerald A. Larue (1916–2014), American scholar of religion, former professor of gerontology, former minister, agnostic, archaeologist and humanist
Gillie Larew (1882–1977), American mathematician
Grace La Rue (1882–1956), American actress, singer and vaudeville star
Henri LaRue (1892–1973), French-Canadian politician
Jason LaRue (born 1974), American former Major League Baseball player
Jim LaRue (born 1925), American football player and coach
Lash LaRue (1917–1996), American actor and star of westerns
Leonard LaRue (1914–2001), American freighter captain who rescued over 14,000 Korean War refugees, in the largest rescue operation by a single ship in history
Mitzy Larue, politician in Seychelles, first elected in 1993
Natalie LaRue, American musician 
Perrault LaRue (1925–1987), French-Canadian politician
Phillip LaRue, American musician
Praxède Larue (1823–1902), French-Canadian physician and politician 
Roger ‘Roc’ LaRue (1939-2019), American Rockabilly singer-songwriter, inducted into the Rockabilly Hall of Fame
Rusty LaRue (born 1973), American basketball coach and former National Basketball Association player
Stoney LaRue (born 1977), American country music singer-songwriter born Stoney Larue Phillips
Travis LaRue (1913–2009), former mayor of Austin, Texas
Vildebon-Winceslas Larue (1851–1906), French-Canadian politician
LaRue family, a family of American pioneers

Given name
LaRue Kirby (1889–1961), American Major League Baseball outfielder
LaRue Martin (born 1950), American former National Basketball Association player
LaRue Parker (1935–2011), former Chairperson of the Caddo Nation of Oklahoma
La Rue Washington (born 1953), briefly a Major League Baseball player

Fictional characters
Clarisse LaRue, a character in Rick Riordan's Percy Jackson and the Olympians series
J.D. LaRue, on the television series Hill Street Blues, played by Kiel Martin
Larue Wilson, in the novel Gidget and on the television series Gidget 
Dominque LaRue a character in the movie Harlem Nights played by Jasmine Guy

Addie Larue

References

French-language surnames